Abul Kalam Azad ( – 23 August 2015) was a Bangladeshi lawyer and politician from Natore belonging to Bangladesh Nationalist Party. He was a member of the Jatiya Sangsad.

Biography
Azad was elected as a member of the Jatiya Sangsad from Natore-3 in the Sixth General Election of Bangladesh. He was elected as the chairman of Singra Upazila Parishad in 2014.

Azad died of cardiac arrest on 23 August 2015 at the age of 60.

References

1950s births
2015 deaths
6th Jatiya Sangsad members
Bangladesh Nationalist Party politicians
People from Natore District
20th-century Bangladeshi lawyers